Nairnshire was a county constituency of the House of Commons of Great Britain from 1708 until 1800, and of the House of Commons of the United Kingdom from 1801 to 1832.

Creation
The British parliamentary constituency of Nairnshire was created in 1708 following the Acts of Union, 1707 and replaced the former Parliament of Scotland shire constituency of Nairnshire . Nairnshire was paired as an alternating constituency with neighbouring Cromartyshire. The freeholders of Nairnshire elected one Member of Parliament (MP)  to one Parliament, while those of Cromartyshire elected a Member to the next.

Boundaries
The constituency covered the entire Scottish county of Nairnshire.

History
Prior to the 1832 Reform Act, the constituency was generally controlled by the Dukes of Argyll or Campbells, the number of voters varying between 15 and 30.

The Representation of the People (Scotland) Act 1832 abolished the alternating constituencies. Nairnshire was merged with Elginshire to form the single constituency of Elginshire and Nairnshire, both counties electing one Member between them to each Parliament.

Members of Parliament

References

Historic parliamentary constituencies in Scotland (Westminster)
Constituencies of the Parliament of the United Kingdom established in 1708
Constituencies of the Parliament of the United Kingdom disestablished in 1832